The Maratha Light Infantry is a light infantry regiment of the Indian Army. It traces its lineage to the Bombay Sepoys, raised in 1768, making it the most senior light infantry regiment in the Indian Army. The class composition of the regiment was and is primarily formed by Maratha recruits from the former Maratha Empire. The men are mostly drawn from all over the state of Maharashtra, with some percentage from Marathi-speaking areas of Karnataka including Coorg. The regimental centre has been in Belgaum, Karnataka, since 1922, which was part of the Bombay Presidency at that time. The battle cry of Maratha Light Infantry is, "Bola Shri Chhatrapati Shivaji Maharaj Ki Jai (Say Victory To King Shivaji)".
Maratha regiment is the strongest regiment in India. 
The regiment has won over 79 battle honours, including 25 in World War I.

History

Pre-independence

The Marathas were a potent force in 16th, 17th, and 18th century India. Their military qualities were brilliantly optimised in their historic campaigns against the Mughals under the leadership of the Emperor  Chatrapati Shivaji Maharaj and succeeding Maratha rulers. Maratha armies, comprising both infantry and light cavalry, along with the Maratha Navy had dominated the military scene in India for three centuries. The 1st battalion of the regiment, known as Jangi Paltan ("the fighting unit"), was raised in August 1768 as the 2nd Battalion, Bombay Sepoys, to protect the British East India Company’s possessions on the islands of Bombay.

The second battalion known as Kali Panchwin followed the next year as the 3rd Battalion, Bombay Sepoys. These two battalions were at the forefront of virtually every major engagement fought on the west coast from Surat to Cannanore during the last quarter of the 18th century. Prominent amongst these were the historic battles of Seedaseer and Seringapatam where in the words of Richard Wellesley their conduct and success were seldom equalled and never surpassed.

The turn of the 19th century was witness to the expansion of the regimental group with the raising of the 3rd battalion as the 2nd battalion, 5th (Travancore) Regiment of the Bombay Native Infantry in 1797. The Maratha Light Infantry Regimental Centre was raised in March 1800 as the 2nd battalion, 7th Regiment of Bombay Native Infantry; the 4th battalion in April 1800 as the 2nd battalion, 8th Regiment Bombay Infantry and the 5th battalion from the Bombay Fencibles as the 1st battalion, 9th Regiment of Bombay Native Infantry in December 1800.

In the second half of the 19th century, the battalions fought in various campaigns from the Middle East to China. In recognition of the gallant conduct of its detachments at the siege of Kahun and the defence of Dadar, in Baluch territory during the First Anglo-Afghan War in 1841, the Kali Panchwin was created Light Infantry. Later, this honour was also bestowed on the 3rd and 10th Regiments of the Bombay Infantry (present 1st battalion, Maratha Light Infantry and 2nd battalion, Parachute Regiment respectively) for their gallantry in Sir Robert Napier’s Abyssinian Campaign of 1867-1868. The regiment assumed the title 5th Mahratta Light Infantry in 1922.

Three Maratha battalions distinguished themselves during the First World War (1914–1918) in the long drawn-out Mesopotamia campaign. The 117th Mahrattas (present 5th battalion, Maratha Light Infantry) was made into a Royal battalion for its conspicuously distinctive service during its campaign in Mesopotamia, particularly in the events leading to enemy capitulation after the bitter 146-day siege at Kut-el-Amara. The battalion was mostly composed of Marathas from the Khandesh region and Nashik district. For some unclear reasons even after winning, the regiment did not return to India. The 114th Mahrattas (present Regimental Centre) was awarded 28 gallantry awards for their performance in the battle of Sharquat, the highest earned by any unit in a single action. The other Maratha battalions, namely the 105th Mahratta Light Infantry, 110th Mahratta Light Infantry and 116th Mahrattas also acquitted themselves in Palestine and Mesopotamia.

The Second World War saw the Marathas in the forefront in almost every theatre of operations from the jungles of Southeast Asia to the deserts of North Africa, and the mountains and rivers of Italy. The war also saw the expansion of the regiment when thirteen new war service battalions were raised. Most of these were later demobilised after the war, whilst two were converted into artillery regiments. During the war Nk. Yeshwant Ghadge and Sep. Namdeo Jadhav were decorated with the Victoria Cross in the Italian campaign, while 130 other decorations were awarded to the regiment.

Apart from being the first light infantry battalion, of the Indian Army, Kali Panchwin was the first Indian battalion to participate in World War II, first to have lost its commanding officer in action (Col. Chitty at the battle of Jebel Hamrin, 1917) and the first Maratha battalion to participate in a United Nations mission. Later, it earned the Indian Army's first Ashoka Chakra in India's northeast.

Post-independence

Indian independence saw the regiment reverting to the original five battalions, with the 3rd Maratha Light Infantry converting to the airborne role and becoming the 2nd battalion, Parachute Regiment in April 1952. With the integration of the erstwhile princely states, the 19th, 20th, 22nd battalions were amalgamated, from the state forces of Satara, Kolhapur, Baroda, and Hyderabad, with the regiment. The expansion of the Indian Army to meet the omnipresent threat to its borders has seen the regiment grow to its present strength of 18 regular battalions and two Territorial Army battalions whilst the period also saw the conversion of the 21st battalion into the 21st battalion, Parachute Regiment (Special Forces) and the 115 Infantry Battalion (TA) being transferred to the Mahar Regiment.

Since independence, battalions of the Maratha Light Infantry have taken part in every Indian armed conflict — the Indo-Pakistani War of 1947, the Annexation of Junagadh, the Annexation of Hyderabad, the Annexation of Goa, the Sino-Indian War, the Indo-Pakistani wars of 1965 and 1971, against the Chinese on the Sikkim watershed in 1956, Operation Pawan, the ongoing operations on the Siachen Glacier and in numerous counter insurgency operations.

The Ashoka Chakra awarded to Capt. Eric Tucker, Col. N.J. Nair, Col. Vasanth Venugopal and Lt. Navdeep Singh, the five Maha Vir Chakras and the numerous other war and peacetime gallantry awards bear testimony to the front-line leadership and courage of the regiment's officers and soldiers.

Gen. Joginder Jaswant Singh became the first Maratha Light Infantry officer to become the Chief of Army Staff in February 2005.

Units
 1st Battalion - (former 103rd Mahratta Light Infantry)
 2nd Battalion - (former 105th Mahratta Light Infantry) (Ashok Chakra Paltan)
 4th Battalion - (former 116th Mahrattas)
 5th Battalion - (former 117th Mahrattas)
 6th Battalion
 7th Battalion
 8th Battalion
 9th Battalion (Ashok Chakra Paltan)
 11th Battalion
 12th Battalion
 14th Battalion
 15th Battalion
 16th Battalion (Ashok Chakra Paltan)
 17th Battalion
 18th Battalion
 19th Battalion - (former Kolhapur Raja Ram Infantry)
 22nd Battalion - (former 2nd Hyderabad State Infantry)
 23rd Battalion
 24th Battalion
 25th Battalion
 26th Battalion
 42nd Battalion
 101 Infantry Battalion Territorial Army (Maratha Light Infantry) Pune, Maharashtra
 109 Infantry Battalion Territorial Army (Maratha Light Infantry) Kolhapur, Maharashtra
Others:
3rd Battalion is now 2nd Battalion, Parachute Regiment (Special Forces)
20th Battalion (former Baroda State Infantry) is now 10th Battalion, Mechanised Infantry Regiment 
21st Battalion is now 21st Battalion, Parachute Regiment (Special Forces)

Maratha Units in Rashtriya Rifles 

Maratha Units in Rashtriya Rifles (RR) are:
The 17 (RR) 
The 27 (RR) 
The 41 (RR) 
The 56 (RR)

Decorations

Bastille Day 2009
On the occasion of the 221st Bastille day celebrations, a unit from the Maratha Light Infantry led the parade on the Parisian boulevard of Champs-Élysées on 14 July 2009. The military parade was opened with a detachment of 400 soldiers from the three defence services of India, who were attired in ceremonial uniforms. The Indian Prime Minister Manmohan Singh was the guest of honour of the ceremony, an invitee of the French President.

Notable Officers
Gen J.J. Singh
Lt. Gen. D.B. Shekhatkar
Lt. Gen. Satish Nambiar
Lt. Gen. Harinder Singh
Lt. Ge. Jai Singh
Brig. S.S. Shekhawat
Col. N.J. Nair
Lt. Col. K.U. Ahmed
Capt. C.P.K. Nair
Lt. Navdeep Singh

Gallery

References

External links
Maratha Light Infantry - DefenceIndia.com
5th Mahratta Light Infantry | Regiments.org
Maratha Light Infantry Regiment | Regimental Officers Association
Deshon Ka Sartaj, Bharat by the Maratha Light Infantry Band
Redetzky March I Maratha Light Infantry I Indian Army I The Peninsula Studios

Infantry regiments of the Indian Army from 1947
Military units and formations established in 1922
British Indian Army infantry regiments
Units of the Indian Peace Keeping Force
Monuments and memorials to Shivaji